Sacred Heart College is an independent Catholic secondary school, located in the Adelaide beachside suburb of Somerton Park, South Australia and in the suburb of Mitchell Park, in South Australia, Australia. Focused on teaching in the Marist Brothers tradition, the school enrols students from Years 10 to 12.

Sacred Heart is known for its Australian rules football teams, cultivating thorough athletes since its establishment. It has an annual Intercollegiate match against its cross-town rival, Rostrevor College, which is a notable event in the South Australian Catholic Schools sports calendar.

The school also has an annual exchange with Assumption College in Kilmore, Victoria, which entails music and performing arts performances, debating, social and several sporting competitions.

History

In 1897 the Marist Brothers of Adelaide were formally invited by Archbishop John O'Reily to establish an all-boys school in Port Adelaide. The first principal of the school was Brother Stephen DeBourg- the college recognising his achievements through the dedication of the Brother Stephen DeBourg Performing Arts Centre in 2008.

Due to the increasing popularity of the school, Sacred Heart High was relocated to the current site at Somerton Park; this was subsequent to two previous changes in location within the first ten years of its commencement. In 1914 the Marist Brothers acquired Paringa Hall in Somerton Park, the residence of a wealthy pastoralist James Francis Cudmore who had died in 1912. The school was renamed Sacred Heart College (from what?) and it established extensive facilities for its period, as well as the notable college chapel. During its erection the college provided schooling for day students and boarders from Years 4 to Leaving Honours.

In 1977 Sacred Heart College became part of the SW Region scheme and evolved into a senior college catering for the final three years of study. Today, Sacred Heart College Senior is a coeducational senior college for approximately 1,000 students in Years 10 – 12 and continuously upholds the largest graduating class in South Australia.

Campus

The campus' facilities consist of three ovals, nine tennis courts, three basketball courts, a hockey pitch and seven cricket nets.

The school has seen extensive redevelopments of its facilities. These have included the development of the Marcellin Learning Centre and the Brother Stephen DeBorgue Performing Arts Centre which includes music rooms and a multifunctional arts centre. Prior to 2015, the College planned to overhaul Sacred Heart College's War Memorial Oval; the redevelopments were due to conclude in 2014/15. The now completed redevelopments house classrooms, a gymnasium, change rooms and a 1000-seat assembly hall.

The campus is most widely recognised for its stately heritage architecture. Central to the college is "Paringa Hall", named to recognise the Cudmore family's first largest sheep station in the Riverland. Paringa Hall has been defined as one of South Australia's most outstanding late 19th-century family homes remaining upstanding. Designed by Edmund William Wright, a previous Mayor of Adelaide and a notable architect, engineer and businessman, who is also noted for designing the Adelaide Town Hall and Parliament House, Adelaide, the building's opulence speaks of great wealth.

Located east of the campus is the Sacred Heart Memorial Chapel, opened and blessed in 1924 as a memorial to the Old Collegians who lost their lives in the First World War. The college also embodies heritage structures located throughout the college, including the century-old Score Board and Memorial Entrance.

A part of the college campus includes a technology centre and St Paul's which is currently in redevelopment.

Prior to 2017, the college had ten houses:

The college has since transitioned to a five house system:

Notable alumni

Clergy
 James Gleeson, Archbishop of Adelaide
 Francis Henschke

Politicians
 Mark Bishop, ALP senator for South Australia
 Rob Kerin, South Australian Premier

Sportspeople
AFL footballers

Basketball
 Corey Maynard
 Isaac White
Tennis 
 Darren Cahill
 John Fitzgerald

Others
 Bart Cummings, horse trainer
 Nick Percat, Racecar driver
 Maddy Proud, netballer 
 David Sincock cricketer

Miscellaneous
 Rob Chapman, CEO of St George Bank
 Albert James Hannan, Crown Solicitor, Catholic lay leader
 Stephen Kenny, Lawyer best known for defending David Hicks
 Anthony Lehmann (Lehmo), comedian, radio personality, television personality and movie actor
 Mason Crossman, Mr Olympia
 Shaun Micallef, television host and comedian
 Neville Quist, fashion designer for 'Saville Row'
 Robert Stigwood, entertainment entrepreneur
 Godlands- musician

Controversy

The college came to media attention in August 2013 when it was reported that Cory Gregson, a player within its first XVIII was not permitted to make his League debut with the Glenelg Football Club due to him being required to play in an inter-school game against Rostrevor College.

See also

 List of schools in South Australia
 List of boarding schools in Australia

References

External links
 Sacred Heart College Senior website

High schools in South Australia
Boarding schools in South Australia
Catholic secondary schools in Adelaide
Educational institutions established in 1897
Catholic boarding schools in Australia
Association of Marist Schools of Australia
1897 establishments in Australia